A jobholder is a new type of employment status in UK labour law, that was introduced by the Pensions Act 2008, sections 1 and 88. Jobholders are entitled under the Act to be automatically enrolled in an occupational pension.

Meaning
Section 1 of the Act reads:

In turn, section 88 defines a worker in the same way as the Employment Rights Act 1996 section 230, as someone either with a "contract of employment" (on which, see Autoclenz Ltd v Belcher) or someone who personally performs work but is not a client or a customer.

Consequence
The concept of jobholder was a fifth type of employment status in UK labour law. It joins,

"employee" under ERA 1996 section 230, see Autoclenz Ltd v Belcher
"worker" under ERA 1996 section 230
"employment relationship" under EU law
"worker" under EU law, see Pfeiffer v Deutsches Rotes Kreuz

In the ERA 1996 section 205A, the government also created a new "employee shareholder" status, although the takeup of this was so poor that it has no practical relevance.

See also
European labour law
UK labour law

Notes

United Kingdom labour law